Ye is a Chinese-language surname. It is listed 257th in the Song dynasty classic text Hundred Family Surnames, and is the 43rd most common surname in China, with a population of 5.8 million as of 2008 and 2019. Ye is usually romanized as "Yeh" in Taiwan based on Wade-Giles; "Yip", "Ip", and "Jip" in Cantonese; "Iap", "Yap", "Yapp", "Yiapp" and "Yeap" in Hakka and Hokkien.

Pronunciation
In Middle Chinese, Ye was pronounced Sjep.  As late as the 11th-century Guangyun Dictionary, it was a homophone of other characters that are pronounced shè in modern Mandarin and sip in modern Cantonese.

Distribution
As of 2008, Ye is the 43rd most common surname in Taipei Taiwan, with a population of 5.8 million. It is the 22nd most common surname in Taiwan as of 2005.

Origin
Ye means "leaf" in modern Chinese, but the name arose as a lineage name referring to the city of Ye (in modern Ye County, Henan) in the State of Chu during the Spring and Autumn period of ancient China.

According to Sima Qian's Records of the Grand Historian, Yuxiong, a descendant of the Yellow Emperor and his grandson Zhuanxu, was the teacher of King Wen of Zhou.  After the Zhou overthrew the Shang dynasty, King Cheng of Zhou (reigned 1042-1021 BC) awarded Yuxiong's great-grandson Xiong Yi the fiefdom of Chu, which over the ensuing centuries developed into a major kingdom.  King Zhuang of Chu (reigned 613-591 BC) was one of the Five Hegemons, the most powerful monarchs during the Spring and Autumn period.

In 506 BC the State of Wu invaded Chu with an army commanded by King Helü, Wu Zixu and Sun Tzu.  Shen Yin Shu, a great-grandson of King Zhuang and the Chu field marshal, was killed in the aftermath of the Battle of Boju.

After the war King Zhao of Chu enfeoffed Shen Yin Shu's son Shen Zhuliang with the key frontier city of Ye, in gratitude for his father's sacrifice.  Shen Zhuliang subsequently put down the rebellion of Sheng, Duke of Bai, in 478 BC and restored King Hui as ruler of Chu.  King Hui then granted him the titles of prime minister, marshal, and Duke of Ye.

In Zhou dynasty China, noble families usually had two surnames: clan name and lineage name.  Shen Zhuliang, from a cadet branch of the ruling house of Chu, shared the lineage name of Mi of the Chu kings.  He also inherited the clan name of Shen from his father, but his fame led some of his descendants to adopt Ye as their clan name.  Later the distinction between the clan and lineage names was abolished, and Ye became the surname of Shen Zhuliang's descendants. Shen Zhuliang, now better known as Duke of Ye, is considered the founding ancestor of the Ye surname.

Notable people
 Duke of Ye (c. 500 BC), Prime Minister of the State of Chu during the Spring and Autumn period
 Ye Fashan (631–720), Tang dynasty Taoist, revered as an immortal
 Ye Guanglüe (died 911), late Tang dynasty warlord in Guangxi
 Ye Zuqia (葉祖洽; 1046–1117), Song dynasty zhuangyuan and Vice Minister of Personnel
 Ye Mengde (1077–1148), Song dynasty scholar and Minister of Revenue
 Ye Yong (葉顒; 1100–1167), Southern Song dynasty prime minister
 Ye Heng (叶衡; 1114–1175), Southern Song dynasty prime minister
 Ye Shi (1150–1223), Southern Song neo-Confucian scholar
 Ye Sen (葉森; 1190–1208), Southern Song Taoist, revered as god in Fujian
 Ye Shaoweng (fl. 1200–1250), Southern Song poet
 Ye Mengding (叶梦鼎; 1200–1279), Southern Song prime minister
 Ye Chen (葉琛; 1314–1362), Yuan dynasty governor, Marquess of Nanyang
 Ye Fu (葉福; died 1402), Ming dynasty official and military leader
 Ye Xixian (葉希賢; died 1402), Ming dynasty official
 Ye Di (葉砥; 1342–1421), Ming dynasty scholar-official
 Ye Chun (葉春; 1370–1433), Ming dynasty Vice-Minister of Justice
 Ye Sheng (葉盛; 1420–1470), Ming dynasty scholar-official
 Ye Qi (葉淇; 1426–1501), Ming dynasty Minister of Revenue
 Ye Mengxiong (葉夢熊; 1531–1597), Ming dynasty Minister of War
 Ye Chunji (1532–1595), Ming dynasty scholar-official
 Ye Xianggao (1559–1627), Ming dynasty prime minister
 Ye Xianzu (叶宪祖; 1566–1641), Ming dynasty playwright
 Ye Yongsheng (葉永盛; 16th century), Ming dynasty official, county god of Nanhui
 Ye Tianshi (1667–1747), doctor and Chinese medicine theorist
 Ye Shaokui (葉紹楏; died 1821), Qing dynasty Governor of Guangxi province
 Ye Weigeng (葉維庚; 1773–1828), Qing dynasty official and historian
 Ye Mingchen (1807–1859), Qing dynasty Governor of Guangdong province
 Ye Yunlai (died 1861), Taiping Rebellion general
 Ye Yanlan (叶衍兰; 1823–1898), Qing dynasty official and writer
 Yap Ah Loy (1837–1885), founder of Kuala Lumpur
 Ye Chengzhong (1840–1899), tycoon and philanthropist
 Ye Zhichao (died 1901), Huai Army general
 Yip Sang (葉春田; 1845–1927) Chinese-Canadian businessman
 Yap Kwan Seng (1846–1902), the last Kapitan Cina of Kuala Lumpur
 Ye Changchi (葉昌熾; 1849–1917), Qing dynasty scholar
 Ye Huijun (葉惠鈞; 1863–1932), Republic of China revolutionary and politician
 Ye Dehui (葉德輝; 1864–1927), scholar-official, executed by the Communists
 Ye Lanfang (叶兰舫; 1864–1937), founder of Commercial Guarantee Bank of China
 Ye Xinghai (叶星海; 1870–1929), Tianjin comprador
 Ye Zhuotang (叶琢堂; 1875–1940), banker, general manager of Farmers Bank of China
 Ye Keliang (葉可樑; 1879–1972), Republic of China educator and diplomat
 Ye Zhongyu (叶仲裕; 1881–1909), cofounder of Fudan University
 Ye Ju (1881–1925), Republic of China general and governor of Guangdong province
 Ye Gongchuo (叶恭绰; 1881–1968), Republic of China Finance Minister, Railway Minister, and collector, grandson of Ye Yanlan
 Ye Xiasheng (葉夏聲; 1882–1956), Republic of China politician and lieutenant general
 Ye Zaijun (葉在均; 1885–1951), Republic of China Supreme Court justice
  (1885–1952), founder of Dr. Yap Eye Hospital in Yogyakarta, Indonesia
 Ye Chucang (叶楚伧; 1887–1946), scholar and Kuomintang politician, Governor of Jiangsu
 Ye Jizhuang (1893–1967), PRC Minister of Foreign Trade
 Ip Man/Yip Man (1893–1972), martial arts master, teacher of Bruce Lee
 Ye Shengtao (1893–1988), writer and educator
 Ye Shaoyi (叶少毅; 1895–1919), one of the first Chinese pilots
 Ye Ting (1896–1946), Communist general of the New Fourth Army
 Ye Juquan (叶橘泉; 1896–1989), Chinese medicine scientist, member of the Chinese Academy of Sciences
 Ye Jianying (1897–1986), People's Liberation Army marshal, chairman of the National People's Congress
 Ye Qisun (1898–1977), physicist and educator
 Godfrey Yeh (葉庚年; 1900–1988), entrepreneur
 Ye Xiufeng (1900–1990), Republic of China politician
 Ye Zhupei or Yap Chu-Phay (1920–1971), Filipino-born metallurgist, founder of chemical metallurgy in China, member of the Chinese Academy of Sciences
 Ye Yongfang (叶庸方; 1903–1944), businessman and publisher, son of Ye Xinghai
 George Yeh (1904–1981), Republic of China diplomat and Foreign Minister, nephew of Ye Gongchuo
 Yip Hon (1904–1997), Macau gambling tycoon
 Ye Lingfeng (葉靈鳳; 1905–1975), writer and artist
 Ye Tinggui (葉廷珪; 1905–1977), Mayor of Tainan
 Ye Qianyu (1907–1995), pioneering manhua artist, cofounder of Shanghai Manhua
 Teddy Yip (1907–2003), Indonesian-Chinese businessman, Formula One team owner
 Ye Duyi (叶笃义; 1912–2004), Vice-Chairman of the China Democratic League
 Yap Thiam Hien (1913–1989), Indonesian human rights lawyer, namesake of the Yap Thiam Hien Award
 Yeh Ming-hsun (1913–2009), journalist, cofounder of Shih Hsin University
 Ye Fei (1914–1999), Filipino-Chinese general, commander of the Chinese Navy
 Ye Junjian (叶君健; 1914–1999), novelist in Chinese and Esperanto, translator
 Ye Duzhuang (叶笃庄; 1914–2000), agronomist, brother of Ye Duyi
 Ye Peida (1915–2011), cofounder and president of Beijing University of Posts and Telecommunications
 Ye Duzheng (1916–2013), meteorologist and member of the Chinese Academy of Sciences, brother of Ye Duyi
 Ye Qun (1917–1971), wife of Vice-Chairman Lin Biao
 Ye Zhishan (叶至善; 1918–2006), writer and publisher, son of Ye Shengtao
 Ye Shuifu (叶水夫; 1920–2002), translator, President of Translators Association of China
 Ye Hongjia (葉宏甲; 1923–1990), Taiwanese cartoonist
 Chia-ying Yeh (born 1924), Chinese-Canadian poet and scholar
 Ye Lizhong (叶利中; 1924–1999), xiangsheng performer, brother of Ye Duyi
 Ye Zhemin (1924–2018), art historian
 Ye Xuanping (1924–2019), Governor of Guangdong, son of Ye Jianying
 Ip Chun (born 1924), martial artist, son of Yip Man
 Yeh Shih-tao (1925–2008), Taiwanese writer and historian
 Ye Qingbing (葉慶炳; 1927–1993), Taiwanese writer and scholar
 Ye Qingyao (1927–2019), Taiwanese-born Chinese engineer and politician
 Ye Shuhua (born 1927), astronomer, member of the Chinese Academy of Sciences
 Ye Zhengda (1927–2017), aircraft designer and PLA lieutenant general, son of Ye Ting
 Ye Weiqu (1929–2010), Chinese-Vietnamese writer and translator
 Geoffrey Yeh (born 1931), businessman, son of Godfrey Yeh
 Yeh Changti (1933–2016), Republic of China Air Force pilot, member of the Black Cat Squadron
 Ye Liansong (born 1935), Communist Party Chief and Governor of Hebei Province
 Ye Xiushan (1935–2016), philosopher
 Ye Peiqiong (born 1937), table tennis player
 Ye Xuanning (1938–2016), major general, son of Ye Jianying
 Ye Rutang (叶如棠; born 1940), architect, Vice-Minister of Construction
 Ye Yonglie (born 1940), science fiction and biography writer
 Thomas Yeh Sheng-nan (born 1941), Taiwanese prelate of the Roman Catholic Church, diplomat of the Holy See
 Ye Caiyu or Ye Ling (葉彩育; 1942–2012), Taiwanese singer
 Ye Wenling (born 1942), novelist and politician
 Arthur Yap (1943–2006), Singaporean poet, writer, and painter
 Ye Chenghai (born 1943), politician and billionaire entrepreneur, founder of Salubris Pharmaceuticals
 Yeh Chin-fong (born 1943), former Republic of China Minister of Justice
 Johnny Ip (葉振棠; born 1944), Hong Kong singer and actor
 Ye Lipei (叶立培; born 1944), real estate developer
 Ye Peijian (born 1945), commander of the Chinese Lunar Exploration Program
 Deanie Ip (born 1947), Hong Kong singer and actress
 Frances Yip (born 1947), Hong Kong singer
 Wing-Huen Ip (葉永烜; born 1947), Chinese-German astronomer
 Laurence Yep (born 1948), Chinese-American writer, author of the Dragon series
 Yeh Hsien-hsiu (born 1948), Taiwanese singer and politician
 Yeh Chu-lan (born 1949), former Vice Premier of the Republic of China
 Ye Xiaowen (born 1950), scholar and politician
 Yeh Ching-chuan, Minister of Health, Republic of China
 Bing Yeh (born 1950), Taiwanese-American entrepreneur, founder of Silicon Storage Technology
 Ip Kwok-him (born 1951), Hong Kong politician
 Ip Yut Kin (born 1951), CEO of Apple Daily
 Stephen Ip (born 1955), Hong Kong politician
 Ye Shuangyu (叶双瑜; born 1955), Vice-Governor of Fujian province
 Ye Xiaogang (born 1955), composer
 Ye Tan (born 1956), economist
 Yeh Kuang-shih (born 1957), Republic of China Minister of Transportation and Communications
 Yeh Jiunn-rong (born 1958), Minister of Education of the Republic of China
 John Yap (born 1959), Singaporean-born Canadian politician
 V-Nee Yeh (born 1959), Hong Kong businessman, son of Geoffrey Yeh
 Yip Wing-sie (born 1960), Hong Kong musician
 Nai-Chang Yeh (born 1961), Taiwanese-American physicist
 Sally Yeh (born 1961), Taiwanese-Canadian singer and actress
 Yip Kai Foon (born 1961), Hong Kong gangster
 Ip Kin-yuen (born 1962), Hong Kong politician
 Yeh Lee-hwa (葉李華; born 1962), Taiwanese science fiction writer
 Ye Rongguang (born 1963), first Chinese chess Grandmaster
 Yip Sai Wing (born 1963), drummer of Hong Kong rock band Beyond
 Wilson Yip (born 1963), Hong Kong actor and filmmaker
 Zhenli Ye Gon (born 1963), Chinese-Mexican businessman, alleged drug trafficker
 Ye Qiaobo (born 1964), world champion speed skater
 Amy Yip (born 1965), Hong Kong actress
 Arthur Yap (born 1965), Filipino politician
 Yeh Shin-cheng (born 1965), Vice-Minister of the Environmental Protection Administration (Republic of China)
 Yip Tin-shing (born 1965), Hong Kong screenwriter
 Veronica Yip (born 1966), Hong Kong actress
 Timmy Yip (born 1967), Hong Kong film art director, Academy Award winner
 Vern Yip (born 1968), Hong Kong-born American interior designer
 Ye Chong (born 1969), fencer, Olympic medalist
 Ye Kuangzheng (叶匡政; born 1969), writer and poet
 Yeh Min-chih (葉民志; born 1970), Taiwanese actor
 Ye Pengzhi (叶鹏智; born 1971), CEO of Guangdong Aluminum
 Ye Zhibin (born 1971), football player and coach
 Françoise Yip (born 1972), Chinese-Canadian actress
 Gloria Yip (born 1973), Hong Kong actress
 Barry Ip (葉文輝; born 1974), Hong Kong singer and actor
 Ye Haiyan (born 1975), gender activist
 Gary Yap (born 1977), Malaysian television host
 Ye Jianming (born 1977), billionaire founder of CEFC China Energy
 Ip Pui Yi (born 1978), Hong Kong Olympic sports shooter
 Yeh Hsien-chung (born 1979), Taiwanese footballer
 Grace Ip (葉佩雯; born 1980), Hong Kong singer and actress
 Jaique Ip (born 1980), Hong Kong snooker player
 Michelle Ye (born 1980), actress and Miss Chinese International winner
 Tracy Ip (born 1981), Miss Hong Kong 2005
 Ye Jia (born 1981), football player
 Yeh Ting-jen (born 1983), Taiwanese baseball player
 Ye Yiqian (叶一茜; born 1984), singer and actress
 Ye Zuxin (叶祖新; born 1984), actor
 Brandon Yip (born 1985), Canadian NHL hockey player
 Yip Chi Ho (born 1985), Hong Kong footballer
 Ye Weiting (葉瑋庭; born 1985) Taiwanese singer
 Yeh Yung-chieh (born 1985), Taiwanese baseball player
 Anna Kay or Ye Xiqi (叶熙祺; born 1987), singer and actress
 Yip Pui Yin (born 1987), Hong Kong badminton player
 Ye Qing (叶青; born 1988), actress
 Sammi Yip (葉慧婷; born 1988), Hong Kong singer
 Ip Chung Long (born 1989), Hong Kong footballer
 Ye Weichao (born 1989), football player
 Yapp Hung Fai (born 1990), Hong Kong soccer goalkeeper
 Ye Chongqiu (born 1992), football player
 Ye Shiwen (born 1996), swimmer, Olympic gold medalist and world record holder
 William W-G. Yeh, civil engineer
 Yeh Shuhua (born 2000); Taiwanese singer, dancer, member of the South Korean group (G)I-DLE
 Yap Weng Wah (叶荣华; born 1983), Malaysian ex-engineer and convicted serial rapist who had sexually assaulted 31 boys in Singapore

References

External links 
 Descendants of Ye visit ancestral lands (in Chinese)
 Sina surname wiki project (in Chinese)

Chinese-language surnames
Chu (state)
Individual Chinese surnames